The 1970 Canadian Professional Snooker Association tournament was a snooker tournament played at the North York Centennial Centre, Toronto, from 30 April to 2 May 1970. Fred Davis defeated Paul Thornley 4–1 in the final to win the title.

Tournament Summary
Six Canadian players progressed into the quarter-finals from a qualifying tournament that concluded on 29 April. They joined English players Fred Davis and Rex Williams, who were exempted, in the main event, which was held at the North York Centennial Centre, Toronto. The quarter-finals were played on 30 April, the semi-finals on 1 May, and the final on 2 May.

Matches were the best of seven . This was invoked in the quarter finals when Davis won the sixth frame to level at 3–3 with Kenny Shea. Shea lost a coin toss, and was asked by Davis to play first. Davis won the match.

Davis recorded breaks of 61 and 52 during the final and defeated Thornley 4–1.

Main draw
Results of the main competition were as follows:

References 

1970 in snooker